Étienne Morillon (16 July 1884, Soucieu-en-Jarrest - 17 October 1949, Soucieu-en-Jarrest) was a French painter and engraver.

Biography 

His father, Benoit Morillon, was a fabric merchant.

From 1905 to 1910, he continued his studies at the Beaux-Arts de Paris, where he was exposed to several avant-garde movements, including Pointillism, Fauvism, and Cubism. His first exhibition was in 1908, at the Salon d'automne. He returned to Lyon in 1910, where he took over a studio that once belonged to Paul Borel.

In 1914, he married Rose Desrats. They had two children. He briefly took part in World War I, but was gassed and discharged with a temporary disability pension. During this time, he began exhibiting at the Salon des Indépendants, in Paris, and would continue to do so through 1924.

Until 1926, he taught drawing at ENSBA. From 1927 to 1930, he worked at the Galerie Saint-Pierre, founded by the Parisian merchant, Alfred Poyet.

The 1930s and 40s were his most creative years. He served as vice-president of the Salon du Sud-Est in 1938 and 1940; exhibiting regularly at the Galerie des Archers and the Galerie de Troncy. His largest showing was at the Exposition Internationale de Lyon, in 1933. He also participated in the Exposition Universelle of 1937, where he was part of a group of artists that decorated Lyon's pavilion.

References

Further reading 
 Bernard Gouttenoire, Dictionnaire des peintres & sculpteurs à Lyon aux XIXe & XXe siècles, La Taillanderie, 2000 
 Jean-Jacques Lerrant, Peintres à Lyon, Éditions Milan, 2001 
 Alain Vollerin, Marjolaine Nardone and Charles Gourdin, Les Ziniars : La vocation de la modernité, Mémoire des Arts, 2001

External links 

 Étienne Morillon (1884-1949) - Un peintre de l'école lyonnaise, a short biography and works @ the Étienne Morillon website

1884 births
1949 deaths
20th-century French painters
French cubist artists
Fauvism
French engravers
People from Rhône (department)